Gaurav Keerthi (born 2 April 1979, in India) is a Brigadier General in the Republic of Singapore Air Force (RSAF) who is also a TV personality and author in Singapore and is the founder of dialectic.sg, an online commenting platform based in Singapore.

Early life and education 
Gaurav was born in India, and grew up in Nigeria and Germany, before his family moved to Singapore when he was aged ten. He later took up Singapore citizenship. He was educated St. Andrews Secondary School before studying at Raffles Institution and Raffles Junior College in Singapore, before going on to Stanford University in the United States where he completed a Bachelor of Arts degree in Economics on a Singapore Armed Forces Overseas Scholarship. After returning to Singapore, he became a helicopter pilot in the RSAF.  He subsequently completed a Master of Public Administration from the John F. Kennedy School of Government in 2014.

Biography 
In 2008, Gaurav served as one of the permanent judges on season 2 of the show The Arena, which was broadcast on Mediacorp Channel 5. He also appeared as a guest judge for one of the semi-finals of Season 1 of the show in 2007. In 2012, he served as the host and moderator for Season 2 of the debate show Bridging Asia: The Singapore Debates, broadcast on Channel NewsAsia.

Gaurav served as the President of Debate Association Singapore from 2006 to 2010, having previously served as the organisation's Vice-President from 2005 to 2006. In 2011, he published a book about debating entitled Think, Speak, Win: Discover the Art of Debate.

In 2019, Gaurav co-founded a community called better.sg, a non-profit targeted at bringing together busy talents from both technical and non-technical backgrounds to build innovative digital tools to address societal problems. Gaurav acts as the CEO for this organization.

Bibliography

References

External links
Think, Speak, Win book website
dialectic.sg website

1979 births
Living people
Raffles Institution alumni
Raffles Junior College alumni
Republic of Singapore Air Force personnel
Singaporean television personalities
Stanford University alumni
Harvard Kennedy School alumni
Indian emigrants to Singapore
Helicopter pilots